The Team normal hill/4 × 5 km event of the FIS Nordic World Ski Championships 2017 was held on 26 February 2017.

Results

Ski jumping
The ski jumping part was started at 12:00.

Cross-country skiing
The cross-country skiing part was started at 15:30.

References

Team normal hill 4 x 5 km